New is an adjective referring to something recently made, discovered, or created.

New or NEW may refer to:

Music
 New, singer of K-pop group The Boyz

Albums and EPs
 New (album), by Paul McCartney, 2013
 New (EP), by Regurgitator, 1995

Songs
 "New" (Daya song), 2017
 "New" (Paul McCartney song), 2013
 "New" (No Doubt song), 1999
"new", by Loona from Yves, 2017
"The New", by Interpol from Turn On the Bright Lights, 2002

Acronyms
 Net economic welfare, a proposed macroeconomic indicator
 Net explosive weight, also known as net explosive quantity
 Network of enlightened Women, a conservative university women's organization
 Next Entertainment World, a South Korean film distribution company

Identification codes
 Nepal Bhasa language ISO 639 language code
 New Century Financial Corporation (NYSE stock abbreviation)
 Northeast Wrestling, a professional wrestling promotion in the northeastern United States

Transport
 New Orleans Lakefront Airport (IATA airport code: NEW)
 Newcraighall railway station (National Rail station code: NEW), in Scotland
 Newton MRT station (MRT station abbreviation: NEW), in Singapore

Other uses
Edel New, a South Korean paraglider design
 New (film), a 2004 Tamil movie
 NEW (TV station), the callsign of Network Ten's station in Perth, Western Australia
 New (surname), an English family name
 new (C++), a built-in operator in the C++ programming language

See also
 
 Brand New (disambiguation)
 GNU (disambiguation)
 Neo (disambiguation)
 New River (disambiguation), various rivers
 News (disambiguation)
 Nu (disambiguation)